Not From Space is a feature-length radio drama broadcast on XM Satellite Radio from 2003.  It was the first Internet-based production recording its actors through email, rather than the traditional studio setting.  In 2015 they announced production of a feature film version.

Plot
A fictional Bill Gates rivals a media mogul, both dreaming of controlling mankind by means of telepathy.  Inhabitants of Earth and Mars both realize they are not alone in the universe. Winner of Mark Time Award for best science fiction 2003.

See also
Radio drama

References

External links
 XM Satellite Radio

American radio dramas